Hermenegildo da Costa Paulo Bartolomeu (born 23 November 1991), simply known as Geraldo, is an Angolan professional football midfielder who plays for Turkish club Ümraniyespor.

Career

Early career 
Born in Luanda, he started his career in 2009, defending Angolan club Norberto de Castro, moving in the same year to Brazilian club Rio Claro, playing in the 2009 Copa São Paulo de Juniores. He joined Andraus of Curitiba after leaving Rio Claro.

Coritiba 
In July 2009, after being observed by head coach René Simões in a friendly game between the reserve squads of Coritiba and Andraus, he was transferred to Coritiba youth team. He joined Coritiba's main squad in 2010, playing his first Série B game on 8 May 2010, at Estádio dos Aflitos, Recife, when his club was defeated 3–1 to Náutico and he came as a substitute for Renatinho. He scored his first Série B goal for Coritiba on 20 November 2010, when he scored a goal against Icasa at Romeirão stadium, thus helping his team win the 2010 edition of the league. Geraldo played his first Série A game on 22 May 2011, when he came up as a substitute for Lucas Mendes in the game against Atlético Goianiense, at Estádio Couto Pereira, won 1–0 by the opponent team.

Paraná 
Geraldo was loaned to Coritiba's fellow Curitiba-based club Paraná on 4 July 2012.

D'Agosto 
Geraldo played 3 seasons for Primeiro de Agosto. Whereas in the first season he may have been overshadowed by the likes of Gelson and Ary Papel, after they moved overseas, he undisputably became the club's biggest asset, finishing all three seasons and the beginning of the 2018–19 with 31 goals, winning 3 league titles and one super cup.

Al Ahly 
In the aftermath of D'Agosto's performance in 2018 where they reached the semi-finals of the Champions League, he signed with Egyptian side Al Ahly SC. He appeared several times on different occasions with Al Ahly in which he surprised, yet he never had a regular basises game time.

Ankaragücü 
In January 2021, Geraldo joined Ankaragücü, after the termination of his contract with Al Ahly.

International career 
Geraldo's first game for the Angolan national team was played in Houston, United States, on 13 May 2010, in his country's defeat against Mexico 1–0, when he came as a substitute for Minguito. He played his second game for the Angolan national team on 11 August 2010, when his country was defeated 2–0 by Uruguay at Estádio do Restelo, Lisbon, Portugal. Geraldo played his third game for Angola on 4 September 2010, when his country was defeated 3–0 by Uganda at Mandela National Stadium, Kampala, Uganda. He played his fourth game for his country on 26 March 2011, when his country was defeated 2–1 by Kenya at Kasarani Stadium, Nairobi, Kenya.

Geraldo played three 2013 Africa Cup of Nations games. The first one, against Morocco on 19 January the second one against South Africa on 23 January and the last one on 27 January against Cape Verde, when he came out as a substitute for Gilberto.

Career statistics

National team

International goals
Scores and results list Angola's goal tally first.

Honors 
Coritiba
 Campeonato Brasileiro Série B: 2010
 Campeonato Paranaense: 2010, 2011, 2012, 2013

Al Ahly
 Egyptian Premier League: 2018–19, 2019–20
 Egypt Cup: 2019–20
 Egyptian Super Cup: 2018–19
 CAF Champions League: 2019–20

References

External links 

1991 births
Living people
Footballers from Luanda
Angolan footballers
Angola international footballers
Angolan expatriate footballers
Association football midfielders
C.D. Primeiro de Agosto players
Coritiba Foot Ball Club players
Paraná Clube players
Red Bull Brasil players
Campeonato Brasileiro Série A players
Campeonato Brasileiro Série B players
Al Ahly SC players
Egyptian Premier League players
2013 Africa Cup of Nations players
2019 Africa Cup of Nations players
Expatriate footballers in Brazil
Angolan expatriate sportspeople in Brazil
Expatriate footballers in Egypt
Angolan expatriate sportspeople in Egypt
Expatriate footballers in Turkey
Angolan expatriate sportspeople in Turkey
MKE Ankaragücü footballers
Ümraniyespor footballers